For the Summer Olympics, there were 11 venues that started with the letter 'J' and 22 venues that started with the letter 'K'.

J

K

References

 List J-K